In mathematics, and more specifically in the theory of C*-algebras, the noncommutative tori Aθ, also known as irrational rotation algebras for irrational values of θ, form a family of noncommutative C*-algebras which generalize the algebra of continuous functions on the 2-torus. Many topological and geometric properties of the classical 2-torus have algebraic analogues for the noncommutative tori, and as such they are fundamental examples of a noncommutative space in the sense of Alain Connes.

Definition 
A quick calculation shows that VU = e−2π i θUV.

Alternative characterizations 
 Universal property: Aθ can be defined (up to isomorphism) as the universal C*-algebra generated by two unitary elements U and V satisfying the relation VU = e2π i θUV. This definition extends to the case when θ is rational. In particular when θ = 0, Aθ is isomorphic to continuous functions on the 2-torus by the Gelfand transform.
 Irrational rotation algebra: Let the infinite cyclic group Z act on the circle S1 by the rotation action by angle 2iθ. This induces an action of Z by automorphisms on the algebra of continuous functions C(S1). The resulting C*-crossed product C(S1) ⋊ Z is isomorphic to Aθ. The generating unitaries are the generator of the group Z and the identity function on the circle z : S1 → C.
 Twisted group algebra: The function σ : Z2 × Z2 → C; σ((m,n), (p,q)) = e2πinpθ is a group 2-cocycle on Z2, and the corresponding twisted group algebra C*(Z2; σ) is isomorphic to Aθ.

Properties

 Every irrational rotation algebra has a unique tracial state.
 The irrational rotation algebras are nuclear.

Classification and K-theory 
The K-theory of Aθ is Z2 in both even dimension and odd dimension, and so does not distinguish the irrational rotation algebras. But as an ordered group, K0 ≃ Z + θZ. Therefore, two noncommutative tori Aθ and Aη are isomorphic if and only if either θ + η or θ − η is an integer.

Two irrational rotation algebras Aθ and Aη are strongly Morita equivalent if and only if θ and η are in the same orbit of the action of SL(2, Z) on R by fractional linear transformations. In particular, the noncommutative tori with θ rational are Morita equivalent to the classical torus. On the other hand, the noncommutative tori with θ irrational are simple C*-algebras.

References 

C*-algebras
Noncommutative geometry